Hudson High School (HHS) is a public high school located in Hudson, Massachusetts, United States.  It is administered by the Hudson Public Schools system, and serves grades 8 through 12.  The current principal is Jason W. Medeiros and the assistant principals are Adam Goldberg for sophomores, juniors, and seniors, and Daniel McAnespie for grade eight and freshmen.

History
The first high school building in Hudson was built in 1867, only one year after the town itself was incorporated. The building, located on High Street, was used as the high school until 1882. After that it was used as an elementary school for a number of years. The two-story wood building still stands, now housing the Hudson Animal Hospital.

The second high school, a two-story brick building known as the Felton Street School, was completed in 1882 and served as the high school until 1956. It was then used as a grade school for some time until being remodeled into a condominium complex. It is still standing and was added to the National Register of Historic Places in 1986.

A new high school was built in 1956 on Packard Street after the Felton Street School became too small. This new building was used as the high school until 1970, when it was replaced. It was the town's middle school for a short time and was renamed the Carmela A. Farley School after a long-time Hudson teacher. The school became an elementary school and was remodeled in 1999. Its main entrance is now on Cottage Street.

The building that replaced the one on Packard Street was completed in 1970 and was located on Brigham Street. It served as the high school until about 2004, when it was knocked down and replaced by a modern multimillion-dollar school.

The newest and current Hudson High School building was finished in 2004, replacing the 1970 high school located on the same Brigham Street site. In order to construct the new building it was built behind the previous building, where school was kept in session during construction. Once construction of the new building finished, the old building was demolished and a new parking lot built in its stead. The former parking lot was also demolished to make way for a practice football field. In addition to the practice field, six renovated tennis courts, two baseball/softball fields, and a clubhouse for the Hudson High School Athletics Booster Club were also built as part of the project.

Academics 
Hudson High School has a counseling program to assist students in reaching their academic potential. The school also offers comprehensive courses in the following areas of study:

English Language Arts: Creative Writing I & II, Reader's & Writer's Workshop, Critical Media Literacy, Understanding Linguistics, Journalism I, II & III, Coming-of-Age Literature, Dystopian Literature
Mathematics: 8th Grade Math, Algebra I & II, Geometry, Statistics, Pre-Calculus, Calculus, Functions & Operations, Essential Math.
Science: 8th Grade Science, Biology, Chemistry, Physics, Anatomy & Physiology I & II, Environmental Science, Genetics, Forensic/DNA Science, Invertebrate Zoology, Earth Science & Natural History, Essentials of Physical Science
Social Studies: U.S. & The World History I, II & III, Ethics, Sociology, Global Citizenship & Humanitarian Aid, World Cultures, Contemporary Legal issues, Social Justice, Psychology, Abnormal Psychology, Histories of World Regions, Economic Theories, Contemporary World Issues, Conflict Resolution
Business: Accounting I, Business Management, Introduction to Marketing, Personal Finance in Today's Economy
Technology: Computer Animation, Computer Design & Production, Web 2.0/Cloud Computing, Robotics with LEGO Mindstorms, Robotic Design, Introduction to CAD, PLTW Engineering, Introduction To Engineering & Design, Principles of Engineering, Digital Electronics, Engineering Development & Design, Digital Imaging & Design, Graphic Design I, Architectural & Interior Design, Video Game Design & Development I & II, Web Design, Exploring Mobil App Creation for Web Designers, Computer Programming I, Media, TV News, Video Animation
World Languages: Spanish I, II, III, IV & V, Portuguese I, II, III, IV, V, French
Visual Arts: Art I, II, III & IV, Studio Art, Pottery I & II, Darkroom Photography I & II, Art History, Intro to Creative Fashion Design), *Performing Arts: Drama I & II, Advanced Theatre Studies, Musical Theatre, Keyboard I & II, Chorus I & II, Concert Band, Wind Ensemble, Music Theory I), 
AP Capstone Seminar & Research,  
Wellness, Health & Physical Education, 
Early Childhood Education and Care: Child Growth & Development, Early Childhood Education I & II
The school also offers online courses through Virtual High School.

Advanced Placement courses include:

 AP Seminar
 AP Research
 AP Biology
 AP Calculus AB
 AP Calculus BC
 AP Chemistry
 AP English Language & Composition
 AP Environmental Science
 AP Music Theory
 AP Physics
 AP Psychology
 AP Spanish
 AP Statistics
 AP Studio Art
 AP U.S. Government & Politics
 AP U.S. History

School Choice 
Hudson High School participates in the Massachusetts School Choice Program. This program allows students residing in neighboring towns to attend Hudson High School, and for students residing in Hudson to attend public high school in other towns.

Athletics 
Hudson High School's athletic teams are known as the  Hudson Hawks, and the  school's mascot is the Hudson Hawk. Hudson's longtime athletic rival is the neighboring city of Marlborough, especially in football. Every Thanksgiving the two rivals compete in a "Turkey Day" football game, alternating home-field advantage each year. Hudson has not won a Turkey Day game since 2010 and has not won one at home since 2005. The rivalry traces its origins back to at least 1906.

In 2012 the Hudson boys' varsity hockey team went 23-1-1 to capture the MIAA State Championship, defeating Medway at the TD Garden by a score of 5-1.

Currently Hudson High School fields 19 teams in the following sports:

 Fall
 Boys' & Girls' Cross Country
 Boys' & Girls' Soccer
 Football
 Field hockey
 Volleyball
 Dance
 Cheerleading
 Golf
 Winter 
 Boys' & Girls' Basketball
 Boys' & Girls' Hockey (Girls are co-op with Algonquin Regional High School in Northborough)
 Boys' & Girls' Indoor Track
 Gymnastics
 Cheerleading
 Swimming (co-op with Nashoba Regional High School in Bolton)
 Wrestling (co-op with Keefe Regional Technical High School in Framingham)
 Spring 
 Baseball
 Softball
 Boys' & Girls' Lacrosse
 Boys' & Girls' Tennis
 Boys' & Girls' Outdoor Track
 Unified Track
 Co-Ed Ultimate Frisbee (club)

Notable alumni
 Burton Kendall Wheeler – Class of 1900 – former U.S. senator from Montana
 William C. Sullivan – Class of 1930 – former head of FBI intelligence operations
 Charles Precourt – Class of 1973 – retired United States Air Force colonel and astronaut
 Hugo Ferreira – Class of 1992 – singer-songwriter for the band Tantric
 Matt Burke – Class of 1994 – former defensive coordinator for the Miami Dolphins, current defensive special assistant for the Philadelphia Eagles
 Evan Markopoulos – Class of 2012 – professional wrestler

References

External links
Hudson High School website
Hudson Public Schools website
Hudson High School profile at Massachusetts Dept. of Education website
Hudson High School at NEASC website (scroll down)
Hudson High School at Civic Mission of Schools website

Schools in Middlesex County, Massachusetts
Public high schools in Massachusetts
Buildings and structures in Hudson, Massachusetts